SCW may refer to:
 Spanish Civil War Conflict occurred in Spain (1936-1939).
 Seabee combat warfare specialist insignia, an enlisted warfare qualification of the U.S. Navy.
 Security Configuration Wizard, a component of Windows Server 2003 SP1
 Small Chemical Waste, a category ol medical emergency wherein air or gas is present in the pleural cavity.
 Supercritical water, a special phase of water
 Supreme Council for Women, Bahrain's advisory body to the government on women's issues
 Syktyvkar Airport, is an airport located 3 km southeast of Syktyvkar, Komi Republic, Russia
 Syrian civil war (or 'Syrian Civil War') (2011-present)
  SCW South Championship Wrestling (2014-Present)